U.S. Route 30 (US 30) is a road in the United States Numbered Highway System that runs from Astoria, Oregon, to Atlantic City, New Jersey. In Indiana, the route runs from the Illinois state line at Dyer to the Ohio state line east of Fort Wayne and New Haven. The  of US 30 that lie within Indiana serve as a major conduit. The entire length of U.S. Route 30 in Indiana is included in the National Highway System (NHS). The highway includes four-lane, rural sections, an urbanized, four-lane divided expressway, and several high-traffic, six-lane freeway areas. First designated as a US Highway in 1926, US 30 replaced the original State Road 2 (SR 2) and SR 44 designation of the highway which dated back to the formation of the Indiana State Road system. A section of the highway originally served as part of the Lincoln Highway. Realignment and construction projects have expanded the highway to four lanes across the state, and the road is now part of a long stretch of US 30 from New Lenox, Illinois, to Canton, Ohio, where the road has at least four lanes (excluding ramps). There are over 40 traffic signals between I-65 at Merrillville and I-69 at Fort Wayne.

Route description 
The entire length of U.S. Route 30 in Indiana is included in the National Highway System (NHS), a network of highways that are identified as being most important for the economy, mobility and defense of the United States.  The highway is maintained by the Indiana Department of Transportation (INDOT), similar to all other U.S. Highways in the state. The department tracks the traffic volumes along all state highways as a part of its maintenance responsibilities using a metric called average annual daily traffic (AADT), calculated along a segment of roadway for any average day of the year. In 2010, INDOT figured that lowest traffic levels were 10,870 vehicles and 4,750 commercial vehicles used the highway daily between US 31 and SR 331. The peak traffic volumes were 69,280 vehicles and 12,660 commercial vehicles AADT along a section of US 30 that is concurrent with I-69, between the Lima Road (interchange 311) and Coldwater Road (interchange 312) exits in Fort Wayne.

Illinois to Valparaiso 
US 30 enters Dyer from Lynwood, Illinois, along the original alignment of the Lincoln Highway, as a four-lane divided highway. At Moeller Street, the roadway becomes a four-lane highway with a center turn lane before reaching an at-grade intersection with CSX railroad tracks. Thereafter, the road returns to four-lane divided highway before a traffic light at US 41 in Schererville and passing under Norfolk Southern railroad tracks. After US 41, the original alignment of the Lincoln Highway leaves US 30 and continues along the same route as old State Road 330 (SR 330). US 30 begins to curve towards the southeast, still as a four-lane divided highway. The highway has a traffic light at SR 55, heading east as the roadway enters Merrillville, where the route becomes a six-lane divided highway and has an interchange at Interstate 65 (I-65). At Colorado Street in Merrillville, the road narrows back to a four-lane divided highway.

After a traffic light at the southern terminus of SR 51 in Hobart, the original alignment of the Lincoln Highway rejoins US 30. The highway passes through a mix of farmland and residential properties on the way to Valparaiso, entering the city and passing through commercial properties. The highway has a traffic light at SR 2 at the western end of the concurrency of the two roads. From there, the road crosses railroad tracks, passes south of Valparaiso University, and has a traffic light at the eastern terminus of SR 130. After passing the traffic light at SR 130, the road has a full interchange with SR 49 and the eastern terminus of the SR 2 and US 30 concurrency. Continuing east, the road passes the Porter County Municipal Airport and proceeds east-southeast from Valparaiso, towards Plymouth.

Valparaiso to Allen County 
After leaving the Valparaiso area, US 30 passes through rural farmland, with an intersection at US 421 northeast of Wanatah and an at-grade railroad crossing with the Chesapeake and Indiana Railroad.  East of the railroad tracks is an intersection with SR 39 and a bridge across the Kankakee River. Then the route briefly swings slightly to the north of the old Lincoln Highway alignment to accommodate an interchange at US 35.

US 30 runs along the north side of Plymouth, passing through an interchange with the northern terminus of SR 17 and near the Plymouth Municipal Airport. The route curves around the northeast side of the city, having a major interchange with US 31 before heading east-southeast towards Warsaw. At Bourbon, the highway has an interchange with SR 331. The road curves east before entering Warsaw and has an interchange with SR 15, south of the Warsaw Municipal Airport. After passing the airport, the road enters a mix of commercial and residential properties. As it bypasses Warsaw the highway passes through a highly commercial area and has nine traffic signals within four miles, causing frequent traffic backups. One of these is a traffic light at an old alignment of the Lincoln Highway, before US 30 passes north of Winona Lake and heads towards Columbia City.

At Columbia City, the road turns southeast and has traffic lights at SR 109, SR 9, and SR 205, again closely spaced, resulting in frequent congestion. After SR 205, US 30 heads east towards Fort Wayne, paralleling the Chicago, Fort Wayne and Eastern Railroad.

Allen County to Ohio

Western Allen County 

US 30 crosses into Allen County at a signalized intersection with Whitley County Road 800 East (signed as County Line Road). After passing a pair of abandoned rest areas, the four-lane divided highway with partial access control then becomes a full access controlled freeway just east of the signalized intersection at Kroemer Road. Immediately thereafter, there is a trumpet interchange with US 33 (Goshen Road), at the western terminus of US 33's concurrency with US 30. From there, the joined routes proceed southeast as a six-lane (counting auxiliary lanes) freeway, passing under Hillegas Road, to a cloverleaf interchange with I-69.  At that junction, US 33 joins southbound I-69 (and westbound  US 24), while US 30 loops to the north, to run concurrent with both northbound I-69 and eastbound US 24. The through lanes revert to an urban arterial and continue southeast into Fort Wayne as Goshen Road, carrying SR 930 only as far as Coliseum Boulevard (where it departs to the east, leaving Goshen Road to revert to an undivided city street).

Fort Wayne to New Haven 
US 30's concurrency with I-69 is a six-lane urban interstate with interchanges at Lima Road (US 27 and SR 3) and Coldwater Road (formerly SR 327 and prior to that, US 27). At the interchange of I-69 and I-469, US 30 heads east concurrent with I-469 to loop around the north and east sides of Fort Wayne, heading toward New Haven. I-469 is a four-lane interstate passing through a mix of farmland and suburban residential properties. Initially proceeding east, the interstate crosses the St. Joseph River and has an interchange at Maplecrest Road before turning southeast, then south around the northeast side of Fort Wayne to subsequent interchanges with SR 37 followed by US 24. After the US 24 interchange, the interstate crosses the Maumee River and Norfolk Southern railroad tracks before US 30 departs I-469 east of downtown New Haven at the eastern terminus of SR 930.

Eastern Allen County 
After I-469, US 30 heads southeast away from New Haven, passing through rural farmland as a four-lane divided highway with partial access control. The route bypasses the tiny hamlets of Zulu, Tillman, and Townley with an intersection at SR 101 just to the north of the latter. US 30 completes its journey across the Hoosier State and enters Ohio (at State Line Road), continuing southeast toward Van Wert.

History 

The Lincoln Highway was planned in 1913 to run west to east across Indiana, including to South Bend and Fort Wayne. In 1915, the highway opened and passed through downtown Fort Wayne on its route through Indiana, and was assigned the designation of Main Market route number 2 in 1917.  Further designations saw the route become SR 2 from the Illinois state line to Valparaiso, SR 44 Valparaiso to Fort Wayne and SR 2 from Fort Wayne to the Ohio state line. In the early 1920s, the Lincoln Highway was moved south between Valparaiso and Fort Wayne, to what is now known mostly as Old US 30, passing through Plymouth and Warsaw.  A section of US 30 in Dyer known as the "ideal section" of the Lincoln Highway was opened in 1923 and rebuilt in the 1990s.  In 1924, the sections of the road that were part of the original Lincoln Highway was paved, followed by the paving of the rest of US 30, which was commissioned in 1926.  In 1927, a small realignment between Hanna and SR 29 (current US 35) took place.

During the 1950s, US 30 in Fort Wayne was rerouted to a "circumurban" highway that was built along portions of the alignments of Beuter Road and California Road, to bypass most of Fort Wayne. But this "circumurban" route, later renamed Coliseum Boulevard since it passes directly by the Allen County War Memorial Coliseum, quickly became a congested urban highway in its own right as it was not built to freeway standards. In 1998, US 30 in Fort Wayne was again rerouted onto I-69 and I-469, becoming a true controlled access freeway bypass for most of Fort Wayne and New Haven on the north and east side of the two cities. The old Coliseum Boulevard routing was assigned the SR 930 designation as a result, when local officials refused to let INDOT fully decommission the route and turn responsibility for it over to the cities or the county.

Major intersections

See also

References

External links 

30
 Indiana
U.S. Route 030 in Indiana
Expressways in the United States
Transportation in Fort Wayne, Indiana
Transportation in Lake County, Indiana
Transportation in Porter County, Indiana
Transportation in LaPorte County, Indiana
Transportation in Starke County, Indiana
Transportation in Marshall County, Indiana
Transportation in Kosciusko County, Indiana
Transportation in Whitley County, Indiana
Transportation in Allen County, Indiana